An exam is an informal term for an examination or test.

Exam may also refer to:
Exam (2003 film), a Romanian film
Exam (2009 film), a British film

The Exam (2006 film), a Turkish comedy-drama film
The Exam (2011 film), a Hungarian drama film

See also
Assessment (disambiguation)
Examination (disambiguation)